The  Washington Redskins season was the franchise's 52nd season in the National Football League (NFL) and their 47th in Washington, D.C.  The season began with the team trying to win consecutive Super Bowls, following their victory in Super Bowl XVII against the Miami Dolphins. Washington's 14–2 record was a franchise record and the best in the NFL. Their two losses were by a combined two points. Though the Redskins won the NFC Championship and advanced to a second consecutive Super Bowl, they were blown out by the Los Angeles Raiders 9–38 despite being 3-point favorites. They were the first defending Super Bowl champions to qualify for the playoffs since the 1979 Pittsburgh Steelers. 

The Redskins' 541 points scored and +209 point differential was the best in the league, with the 541 points setting an NFL record at the time. The 1983 Redskins also had a turnover margin of +43, an NFL record. Washington was the first team since the merger to record more than 60 takeaways (61).

This season is cornerback Darrell Green's first in the league. He would spend the next 19 years with the team.

Roster

Schedule

Note: Intra-division opponents are in bold text.

Game summaries

Week 1: vs. Dallas Cowboys

Week 2: at Philadelphia Eagles

Week 3: vs. Kansas City Chiefs

Week 4: at Seattle Seahawks

Week 5: vs. Los Angeles Raiders

Week 6: at St. Louis Cardinals

Week 7: at Green Bay Packers

Week 8: vs. Detroit Lions

Week 9: at San Diego Chargers

Week 10: vs. St. Louis Cardinals

Week 11: at New York Giants

Week 12: at Los Angeles Rams

Week 13: vs. Philadelphia Eagles

Week 14: vs. Atlanta Falcons

Week 15: at Dallas Cowboys

Week 16: vs. New York Giants

Playoffs

January 1, 1984

NFC: Washington Redskins 51, Los Angeles Rams 7

January 8, 1984

NFC Championship: Washington Redskins 24, San Francisco 49ers 21

Super Bowl XVIII: Los Angeles Raiders 38, Washington Redskins 9

Standings

Awards and records
 Joe Gibbs, National Football League Coach of the Year Award
 John Riggins, Bert Bell Award
 Joe Theismann, AP NFL MVP
 Joe Theismann, PFWA NFL MVP
 Joe Theismann, NEA NFL MVP
 Joe Theismann, National Football League Offensive Player of the Year Award
 John Riggins, 1,347 Rushing Yards and set record with 24 rushing TDs (Held the TD record for 12 Years)
 Team scoring: 541 points (Held record until 1998)
 Turnover differential: +43 (Record still stands today. Next closest is Cleveland with +33 in 1946.)

References

NFC East championship seasons
Washington
National Football Conference championship seasons
Washington Redskins seasons
Washington Redskins